KSU Stadium, Previously known as Mrsool Park due to sponsorship reasons, is a football stadium located in Riyadh, Saudi Arabia. In September 2020, Saudi Media Company obtained the management rights for operating the stadium. In October 2020, SMC signed a deal with Al Nassr FC for the Mrsool Park to become their home.

History
The construction work on the campus of King Saud University in Western Riyadh started in Spring 2011 and the opening took place in May 2015. The construction work was commissioned to Hashem Contracting Company, based on designs by Michael KC Cheah and his wife Steph, expanding their architectural portfolio of Saudi-based football stadia.

Hashem Contracting Company delivered the stadium following specifications (and FIFA rules for international games) within the budget of 215 million riyals ($57m). The stadium may seem soil-brown or gold depending on the sunlight due to its perforated and metallic outer skin. Mrsool Park went through a renovation at the end of 2020 and this will continue going forward to transform it into a young and family-friendly destination with fan zones and entertainment areas for everyone to enjoy.

In 2020, the stadium went through a re-branding operation becoming Mrsool Park in November 2020, following the signing with the delivery company Mrsool.

In 2021, the stadium hosted the Maradona Cup between Boca Juniors and FC Barcelona to honor Diego Maradona, who died the previous year.

Events
 WWE Crown Jewel (2018)
 WWE Crown Jewel (2022)

Gallery

References

2015 establishments in Saudi Arabia
Sports venues completed in 2015
Football venues in Saudi Arabia
Multi-purpose stadiums in Saudi Arabia
Buildings and structures in Riyadh
Sport in Riyadh
Venues of the 2034 Asian Games
Asian Games football venues